Countryman is a 1982 action/adventure film directed by Dickie Jobson. It tells the story of a Jamaican fisherman whose solitude is shattered when he rescues two Americans from the wreckage of a plane crash. The fisherman, called Countryman, is hurled into a political plot by the dangerous Colonel Sinclair. Countryman uses his knowledge of the terrain and his innate combat skills to survive and protect his new friends from being caught by Sinclair. This film explores Jamaican culture; at the end of the film, it is described as a tribute to the musical legend Bob Marley whose music is often played throughout the film.

The film was the first from Island Records' new film division. The film was shot in Jamaica and featured a reggae soundtrack performed by Lee "Scratch" Perry, Bob Marley & the Wailers, Steel Pulse, Dennis Brown, Aswad, Toots & The Maytals and Rico Rodriguez. It was written by Jobson and  produced by Island Records founder Chris Blackwell and has become a cult classic.

Cast
 Edwin Lothan (1946-2016) as Countryman 
 Hiram Keller as Bobby Lloyd  
 Carl Bradshaw as Capt. Benchley  
 Basil Keane as Colonel Sinclair  
 Freshey Richardson as Mosman  
 Kristina St. Clair as Beau Porter  
 Jahman  
 Papa Threecards as Sadu Baba  
 Munair Zacca as Periera  
 Dee Anthony as Mr. Porter   
 Ronnie McKay as Wax

References

External links

1982 films
1982 drama films
Jamaican drama films
Films set in Jamaica
Reggae films
1980s English-language films